Alexander Huber (born 30 December 1968), is a German  rock climber and mountaineer. He became a professional climber in 1997, and was widely regarded as the world's strongest climber in the late-1990s, and is an important figure in rock climbing history.  Huber has set records in several different rock climbing disciplines, including extreme free solos, new hardest sport climbing routes, and bold first free ascents in big wall climbing.

Early life and education

Huber was born on 30 December 1968, in Trostberg in Bavaria, the second of three children. His father Thomas, already an established climber who had climbed the north face of Les Droites, and his mother Maria, take the children climbing and mountaineering from a young age.  Huber's first four-thousand-metre mountain is Allalinhorn in 1981, his first rock climb is Alte Westwand on the Kleiner Watzmann in 1982, and his first full alpine climbing multi-pitch route is Raunachtstanz (VI+, 6a+) on the Wagendrischelhorn in 1984.  By 1986, aged 18, Huber and his brother Thomas climb Utopia (VIII+, 7a+) on the Wartsteinwand, and in 1988, they ascend Vom Winde Verweht (X-, 8a+) on Scharnstein in the Berchtesgaden Alps.

By 1992, Huber completes his training to become a fully qualified UIAGM mountain guide (as does his brother Thomas).  In 1997, Huber graduated with a Master's in Physics and gets a post-graduate position as an assistant at the Institute for Theoretical Meteorology in the Ludwig Maximilian University of Munich.  In 1998, Huber decides to become a full-time professional climber, one year after Thomas; the pair are known as the "Huberbuam" (Huberboys).

Notable climbs

Sport climbing

Huber was considered one of the world's best sport climbers.
 1991 – Shogun , Karlstien, Bavaria, first ascent, and Huber's first grade 8c.
 1992 – Om , Triangel, Bavaria, first ascent, and second-ever 9a in history.
 1994 – Weisse Rose , Schleierwasserfall, Austria, first ascent.
 1996 –  , Schleierwasserfall, Austria, first ascent; in 2008, Adam Ondra proposed 9a+, the first 9a+ in history (before Realization).

Free solo rock climbing

Huber was one of the few rock climbers who free soloed at extreme grades, in both single-pitch and multi-pitch/big wall routes.
 2002 – Brandler-Hasse Direttissima (5.12a, 17-pitches, 580-metres) of Cima Grande, Dolomites, first-ever big wall solo at 7a+; one of six great north faces.
 2003 – Der Opportunist  (18-metres), Schleierfall, Austria, second-ever free solo of an 8b route.
 2004 – Kommunist  (22-metres), Tyrol, Austria, first-ever free solo of an 8b+ route; Huber said this was his difficulty limit for free solo.
 2004 – Mescalito  (12-metres), Karlstein, Drugwall, Germany, first-ever free solo; as the climb starts at 50-metres, Huber found it his scariest solo.
 2006 – South Face of the Dent du Géant  (200-metres), Mont Blanc, first-ever free solo.
 2008 – Swiss Route (up and down) on Grand Capucin  (400-metres), Mont Blanc, first-ever free solo,  and Huber also downclimbed it solo.
 2008 – Locker Vom Hocker  (8-pitches, 280-metres), Schüsselkarspitze, Germany, after this, Huber largely stopped doing major free solos.
 2009 – Tour Muriciana  (8-pitches, 285-metres), on Mallo Pison, Mallos de Riglos, Spain, first-ever free solo.

Big wall climbing
For a period in the late 1990s, Huber dominated big wall free climbing in Yosemite Valley, as well as in the Alps:
 1995 – Salathé Wall (5.13b, VI, 36-pitches), El Capitan, Yosemite, first free ascent by one individual (Skinner and Piana co-led the FFA in 1988).
 1998 – El Nino (5.13c, VI, A0, 30-pitches), El Capitan, first (almost free) ascent; bar a down-abseil on pitch-13 (A0), was the third route to be freed on El Capitan and the first on the North America Wall.  In 2019, Sonnie Trotter avoided the down-abseil to create the Pineapple Express, a fully free variation of El Nino with 3 extra pitches.
 1998 – Freerider (5.12d, VI, 30-pitches), El Capitan, first free ascent. Huber discovered it while on the Salathe; became an instant classic that Huber called the "Astroman of the new millennium".
 2000 – Golden Gate (5.13a, VI, 41-pitches), El Capitan, first free ascent; a combination of the Salathé Wall and Heart Route.
 2001 –   (10-pitches, 500-metres), on the Cima Ovest, Dolomites, Italy, first free ascent through the huge roof; first-ever big wall route at 8c; later "treated" to soften grade.
 2001 – El Corazon (5.13b, 35-pitches), El Capitan, first free ascent; combination of Salathé Wall, Albatross, Son of Heart and Heart Route.
 2003 – Free Zodiac (5.13d, VI, 16-pitches), El Capitan, first free ascent of the overhanging 1972 aid route; considered very hard for the grade (famous "Nipple pitch"), and is rarely repeated.
 2004 – Zodiac (5.8, A2+, 16-pitches), El Capitan, speed record on the 1972 aid climbing version of Zodiac in 1:51:34.
 2005 –   (16-pitches, 450-metres), on the Grand Capucin, Mont Blanc, first free ascent of the 1997  route; hardest route in Monte Blanc area.
 2007 –   (9-pitches, 450-metres), the Cima Ovest, Dolomites, Italy, first free ascent; follows first 5-pitches of Bellavista, but goes right through 's huge roof.
 2007 – The Nose (5.9, A1), El Capitan, Yosemite, speed record with Thomas Huber on the aid climbing version of The Nose in 2:45:45.
 2012 – Nirwana  (200-metres), Sonnwendwand, Loferer Alm, Austria, first free ascent of one of the hardest multi-pitch rock climbs in the world.

High-altitude and expedition climbing
Huber took part in a wide range of "expedition-type" climbing usually with his brother Thomas Huber, but also part of a larger team:
 1997 – Tsering Mosong (VII 5.10c A3, 26-pitches), on the 1,000-metre west face of Latok II, Karakoram (starts at 6,100-metres), first ascent with Thomas Huber, Conrad Anker and Toni Gutsch.
 1998 – Tichy Route via the northwest ridge of Cho Oyu (8,188-metres), Himalaya, Nepal, Huber climbed the eight thousander to understand the effects of extreme altitude.
 2002 – In Patagonia, ascends: Cerro Torre (via Compressor Route, V A1), Fitz Roy (via Franco-Argentina, VII), and later Cerro Standhardt (via Exocet, 6b, winter ascent); in 2008, Torre Egger.
 2006 – Golden Eagle (5.11, V, A1, 800-metres), on the southwest face of Aguja Desmochada, Fitzroy Massif, in Patagonia, the first ascent, needed aid on an iced pitch (fully freed in 2011).
 2008 – El Bastardo (5.11, V, A1, 500-metres), on the south face of Aguja de la Silla, Fitzroy Massif, in Patagonia, first ascent; some aid needed (fully freed in 2016).
 2008 – Eiszeit (VII+, A4, 24-pitches, 750-metres) on west face, and Skywalk (VII-, 10-pitches, 450-metres) on north pillar of Holtanna, in Antarctica, first ascent and first free ascent respectively.
 2008 – Sound of Silence (VIII-, 5.11a, A2, 20-pitches, 800-metres) on the west pillar of Ulvetanna, in Antarctica, first ascent.
 2009 – Eternal Flame (5.13a, 24-pitches, 650-metres), on Trango ("Nameless") Tower, Pakistan, first free ascent with Thomas Huber of the historic 1989 Güllich, Albert et. al. route.
 2012 – Bavarian Direct (5.13b, 28-pitches, 700-metres), on Mount Asgard, Canada, first free ascent of the 1997 aid climb with Thomas Huber.

Bibliography

Filmography
To the Limit (2007) − Speed climbing The Nose, El Capitan, Yosemite.
 Center of the Universe Climbing in Yosemite

See also 
List of grade milestones in rock climbing
History of rock climbing

References

Further reading

External links
Official Website
Biography

1968 births
Living people
People from Traunstein (district)
Sportspeople from Upper Bavaria
German rock climbers
German mountain climbers
Free soloists
German male non-fiction writers
21st-century German non-fiction writers